Graveyard Classics 2 is the second cover album by Six Feet Under. It is an album cover version of AC/DC's 1980 album Back in Black.

Track listing
All songs by Brian Johnson, Angus Young and Malcolm Young.

Personnel
Six Feet Under
Chris Barnes - vocals
Steve Swanson – guitars
Terry Butler – bass
Greg Gall – drums

Production
Produced by Chris Barnes
Engineered and mixed by Chris Caroll

External links
Official website

2004 albums
Six Feet Under (band) albums
Covers albums
Metal Blade Records albums
AC/DC tribute albums